Pfeiffer University is a private university in Misenheimer, North Carolina. It is affiliated with the United Methodist Church.

History 

Pfeiffer originated from a home school operated by Miss Emily Prudden in the late 19th century.  The school first began operation on the outskirts of Hudson, North Carolina, on Lick Mountain in Caldwell County, North Carolina. University archivist Jonathan Hutchinson said in 2013, "Our accepted founding date is 1885," referring to the date Prudden's first school began, "but Emily probably started the school in about 1898." The school was called Oberlin, after John Frederick Oberlin, a French priest noted for his social improvement in the Alsace Region of France. The school was later endowed by Mrs. Mary P. Mitchell, and the name was changed to the Mitchell School.

A fire destroyed the school in 1907 and it moved to the nearby town of Lenoir, North Carolina. As that location proved inadequate, the school again relocated in 1910, this time to its current location in Misenheimer. The Mitchell School began awarding high school diplomas in 1913.   In 1928 the school began offering junior college classes and was accredited as such in 1934.  It was that year that the Pfeiffer family of New York City gave generous financial gifts to the school for construction of new buildings, and it was then that the name Pfeiffer Junior College was used.

During the 1950s the school began offering senior college courses.  The four-year Pfeiffer College was accredited in 1960 during the administration of Dr. J. Lem Stokes II, President.

Pfeiffer opened a satellite campus in Charlotte, approximately forty miles away, in 1977. The campus moved to a new location in 2017.

In 1996 the college's trustees voted to re-organize to achieve university status, and the current name of Pfeiffer University was adopted.

An outdoor drama entitled "The Legacy of Lick Mountain" relates the beginning of the school, and was presented in Hudson, N.C. in the summer of 2015.

Pfeiffer Junior College Historic District

The Pfeiffer Junior College Historic District is a national historic district encompassing 14 contributing buildings and 1 contributing structure on the campus of Pfeiffer University. They include Georgian Revival-style brick academic buildings erected between 1923 and 1948.  Notable buildings include the Administration Building (1923, remodeled in 1936), Rowe Hall (1935), Merner Hall (1935), Goode Hall (1935), "Practice Home" (1941-1942), Cline Hall (1935), President's House (1935), Jane Freeman Hall (1937), Henry Pfeiffer Chapel (1941-1942), Delight and Garfield Merner Center (1941-1942), Washington Hall (1941-1942), Mitchell Gymnasium (1948-1950), and the Campus Gates (1935).

It was added to the National Register of Historic Places in 1999.

Organization 

Division of Business
Division of Education
Division of Health-Related Programs    
The Graduate School

Graduate studies

Pfeiffer has three graduate campuses. The main graduate campus is located in Charlotte, North Carolina near the SouthPark area. The campus has been in Charlotte since 1996 and currently serves several hundred students. On October 12, 2016, Pfeiffer announced plans to leave its Park Road campus, which it will sell to a developer planning a six-story building with apartments, restaurants, retail and offices. The new location across the street in the Park Seneca building on Mockingbird Lane, with 26,440 square feet on three floors, officially opened October 20, 2017. Pfeiffer's Research Triangle Park campus, located in Morrisville, North Carolina, serves graduate students in Raleigh, Durham, Chapel Hill and surrounding areas.

In November 2016, Albemarle City Council approved incentives for a campus in the city several miles south of the main campus. Graduate programs will be located in a new building at the location of the former Stanly County Museum, which relocated to the City Hall Annex. The Albemarle Hotel may be renovated as a result, because students could live there. Groundbreaking took place January 7, 2019. The first classes were held September 17, 2020.

The graduate degrees offered include master's degrees in business administration, healthcare administration, education, organizational change and leadership, and marriage & family therapy, some of which are offered online as well.

Accreditations

Business School accreditation

Pfeiffer University's Division of Business is a candidate for accreditation from the Accreditation Council for Business Schools and Programs in May 2017.

Marriage and Family Therapy program

Pfeiffer University's Marriage and Family Therapy program, Raleigh-Durham campus, is accredited by the Commission on Accreditation for Marriage and Family Therapy Education.

Programs

Music

For many years (especially the 1970s), Pfeiffer experienced success as a nationally recognized choral program, mostly under the direction of Dr. Richard Brewer. Later, noteworthy instrumental music programs surfaced under the direction of composer Ed Kiefer and Fulbright Professor *Tom Smith.

MFT program

In collaboration with the American Association for Marriage and Family Therapy (AAMFT), the Pfeiffer University MFT Program is an accredited MFT Graduate School approved by the Commission on Accreditation for Marriage and Family Therapy Education (COAMFTE).

Athletics

Pfeiffer's athletic teams are known as the Falcons.  They previously competed in the NCAA's Division II as a member of the Conference Carolinas (formerly the Carolinas-Virginia Athletic Conference), but transitioned to Division III and joined the D-III USA South Athletic Conference in 2017. Men's teams include baseball, basketball, cross country, golf, lacrosse, soccer, tennis, and track and field.  Women's sports consist of basketball, cross country, golf, lacrosse, soccer, softball, swimming, tennis and volleyball.

Notable alumni
Keith Crisco '64 North Carolina Secretary of Commerce
Antonio Harvey, former professional basketball player
Vincent Maddalone, professional boxer
Susan Abulhawa, International best selling author
Coleman Breland, President, Turner Network Sales, Turner Broadcasting System

Gray Stone Day School

Gray Stone Day School, a charter high school, started in Pfeiffer's Harris Building in 2002 and moved to its own campus in 2011, on land donated by Pfeiffer.

References

External links

Pfeiffer Falcon Sports

 
Private universities and colleges in North Carolina
Education in Stanly County, North Carolina
University and college buildings on the National Register of Historic Places in North Carolina
Historic districts on the National Register of Historic Places in North Carolina
Georgian Revival architecture in North Carolina
Educational institutions established in 1885
Universities and colleges accredited by the Southern Association of Colleges and Schools
Universities and colleges in Charlotte, North Carolina
Buildings and structures in Stanly County, North Carolina
1885 establishments in North Carolina
National Register of Historic Places in Stanly County, North Carolina